Amr Ahmed Fathi commonly known as Amr "Samaka" 
(born May 22, 1983) is an Egyptian footballer currently playing for Lebanese Premier League club Al-Safa' SC.

Career
He joined Al Ahly on June 14, 2005 coming from Tersana and participated in 6 Competitions, National League championships and the shield and Egyptian Super Cup and Egypt once African Champions twice and the African Super Cup. Then, he transferred to Kazma.

Amr Samak made a move to his former team Tersana in January 2009. He spent only 6 months there and scored 3 league goals. Then, he made a huge transfer and joined Egyptian side El Gouna. He then joined Petrojet in a big deal.

References

1983 births
Living people
Egyptian footballers
Al Ahly SC players
Tersana SC players
Egypt international footballers
Expatriate footballers in Kuwait
Egyptian expatriate sportspeople in Kuwait
Petrojet SC players
Safa SC players
Egyptian Premier League players
Association football midfielders
Kuwait Premier League players
Kazma SC players
El Gouna FC players
Tala'ea El Gaish SC players
Egyptian expatriate footballers